Binyamin Avniel (born Binyamin Gatstein; 1 November 1906 – 18 June 1993) was an Israeli politician who served as a member of the Knesset for Herut and Gahal from 1951 until 1969.

Biography
Born in Jerusalem during the Ottoman era, Avniel was educated at a heder, before studying at a Teachers Seminary in Jerusalem and then education and social sciences at the University of Brussels, where he earned a PhD in social sciences and economics. He wrote several books, including The Arab Problem in the Land of Israel (1937), The Canton Problem: Facts, Figures and Assumptions (1937), Democracy vs. Dictatorship (1939) and Labor Problem in the Land (1940).

He was elected to the Knesset on the Herut list in 1951, and was re-elected in 1955, 1959, 1961 and 1965, by which time Herut had formed the Gahal alliance with the Liberal Party. He lost his seat in the 1969 elections, and died in 1993.

References

External links
 

1906 births
1993 deaths
Politicians from Jerusalem
Jews in Mandatory Palestine
Israeli political writers
Herut politicians
Gahal politicians
Members of the 2nd Knesset (1951–1955)
Members of the 3rd Knesset (1955–1959)
Members of the 4th Knesset (1959–1961)
Members of the 5th Knesset (1961–1965)
Members of the 6th Knesset (1965–1969)